Kalayathumkuzhi Mathews Beenamol, popularly known as K. M. Beenamol (born 15 August 1975), from Kombidinjal, Idukki district, Kerala is an international athlete from India.

Professional athletics career 
Beenamol and her brother K. M. Binu became the first Indian siblings to win medals in a major international competition. Binu won a silver medal in men's 800m race.

Olympics 
It was during 2000 Summer Olympics, Beenamol was largely unknown, until she became the third Indian woman to reach an Olympic semi-final since P. T. Usha and Shiny Wilson, who achieved almost the same feat in 400m Hurdles in 800m respectively in the 1984 Summer Olympics in Los Angeles.

Asian games 
She won the gold medal in women's 800m and the 4 × 400 m women's relay in the 2002 Asian Games held at Busan.

Achievements

Awards 
Beenamol was conferred Arjuna Award in 2000 for her exemplary achievement in her athletic career. She is also the joint winner of India's highest sporting honour, the Rajiv Gandhi Khel Ratna award in the year 2002–2003 along with Anjali Ved Pathak Bhagwat. In 2004, she was awarded the Padma Shri.

Personal life

K. M. Beenamol is married to Vivek George, a pathologist, and has 2 children, Ashwin and Haile (named after Ethiopian legend Haile Gebrselassie).

See also
List of Kerala Olympians

References

1975 births
Living people
Malayali people
Sportswomen from Kerala
Indian female middle-distance runners
21st-century Indian women
21st-century Indian people
Olympic athletes of India
Athletes (track and field) at the 1996 Summer Olympics
Athletes (track and field) at the 2000 Summer Olympics
Athletes (track and field) at the 2004 Summer Olympics
Asian Games gold medalists for India
Asian Games silver medalists for India
Asian Games medalists in athletics (track and field)
Athletes (track and field) at the 1998 Asian Games
Athletes (track and field) at the 2002 Asian Games
Recipients of the Arjuna Award
Recipients of the Padma Shri in sports
Recipients of the Khel Ratna Award
People from Idukki district
Medalists at the 1998 Asian Games
Medalists at the 2002 Asian Games